Adrienne Jennings Noti (born February 23, 1974) is a magistrate judge of the Superior Court of the District of Columbia who is a nominee to be a judge of the same court.

Education 

Noti received her Bachelor of Arts from the University of North Carolina at Chapel Hill in 1996 and her Juris Doctor, magna cum laude, from the Georgetown University Law Center in 2000.

Legal and academic career 

Noti began her legal career as a law clerk for Judge Carol Bagley Amon of the United States District Court for the Eastern District of New York from 2000 to 2001. From 2001 to 2002, she was a legal fellow with the Center for Reproductive Rights. From 2002 to 2004, she was a staff attorney with the Safe Horizon Domestic Violence Law Project in New York City. From 2004 to 2006, Noti was a clinical law professor at Rutgers School of Law and director of a pro bono program for law students. From 2006 to 2010, she was a clinical law professor at American University’s Washington College of Law. She has also served as an adjunct professor at New York University School of Social Work and the Georgetown University Law Center. From 2010 to 2011, she served as a managing attorney at the D.C. Bar Pro Bono Program. From 2011 to 2014, she was an advisor at the Office of Child Support Enforcement of the United States Department of Health and Human Services.

Judicial career

D.C. superior court magistrate judge service 

She has served as a magistrate judge of the Superior Court of the District of Columbia since 2014.

Nomination to D.C. superior court 

On September 30, 2021, President Joe Biden nominated Noti to serve as a Judge of the Superior Court of the District of Columbia. President Biden nominated Noti to the seat vacated by Judge Frederick H. Weisberg, who his term was expired on March 22, 2018. On December 2, 2021, a hearing on her nomination was held before the Senate Homeland Security and Governmental Affairs Committee. On January 3, 2022, her nomination was returned to the President under Rule XXXI, Paragraph 6 of the United States Senate; she was later renominated the same day. On February 2, 2022, her nomination was favorably reported out of committee. On January 3, 2023, her nomination was returned to the president. She was renominated on January 23, 2023. The Senate Committee on Homeland Security and Governmental Affairs reported her nomination out of committee by a 8–4 vote. Her nomination is pending before the United States Senate.

Personal life 

She has been married to her husband Adav Noti since 2009.

References

External links 

1970s births
Living people
20th-century American women lawyers
20th-century American lawyers
21st-century American judges
21st-century American women lawyers
21st-century American lawyers
Georgetown University Law Center alumni
Georgetown University Law Center faculty
New York (state) lawyers
New York University faculty
Rutgers Law School faculty
University of North Carolina at Chapel Hill alumni
Washington College of Law faculty
21st-century American women judges